1883 in sports describes the year's events in world sport.

Athletics
USA Outdoor Track and Field Championships

American football
College championship
 College football national championship – Yale Bulldogs
Events
 Modification of the scoring rules produces a system of four points for a touchdown, two points for kicks after touchdowns, two points for safeties, and five for field goals.

Association football
England
 FA Cup final – Blackburn Olympic 2–1 Old Etonians (aet).  This is the first time that the FA Cup is won by a professional team and by a team from the north of England.
 Burnley FC moves to its present ground at Turf Moor and plays its first game there in February against Rawtenstall, but loses 6–3.
 Bristol Rovers founded as Black Arabs FC.
Scotland
 Scottish Cup final – Dumbarton 2–1 Vale of Leven (replay following 2–2 draw)

Baseball
National championship
 National League v. American Association – Boston Beaneaters (NL) v. Philadelphia Athletics (AA) cancelled
Events
 The NL, AA, and Northwestern League limit competition in the Tripartite Agreement, the first National Agreement and the birth of so-called "Organised Baseball".
 6 September  — Chicago White Stockings set a still standing record for Major League Baseball by scoring 18 runs in a single inning (the 7th) in a game against the Detroit Wolverines.

Boxing
Events
 American heavyweight champion John L. Sullivan has a scare when he is knocked down in the first round of his fight against Charley Mitchell in New York City.  He recovers to secure a technical knockout when police intervene after the third round and stop the fight.  Sullivan goes on tour across America, fighting mainly in exhibition bouts; none of his genuine challengers last more than three rounds.

Cricket
Events
 England tours Australia to play a Test series of three matches, England winning 2–1 and so regaining The Ashes for the first time.
England
 Champion County –  Nottinghamshire
 Most runs – Walter Read 1,573 @ 47.66 (HS 168)
 Most wickets – Ted Barratt 148 @ 15.90 (BB 8–28)
Australia
 Most runs – Alec Bannerman 434 @ 54.25 (HS 101*)
 Most wickets – Eugene Palmer 51 @ 11.52 (BB 7–65)

Golf
Major tournaments
 British Open – Willie Fernie

Horse racing
England
 Grand National – Zoedone
 1,000 Guineas Stakes – Hauteur
 2,000 Guineas Stakes – Galliard
 The Derby – St. Blaise
 The Oaks – Bonny Jean
 St. Leger Stakes – Ossian
Australia
 Melbourne Cup – Martini-Henry
Canada
 Queen's Plate – Roddy Pringle
Ireland
 Irish Grand National – The Gift
 Irish Derby Stakes – Sylph
USA
 Kentucky Derby – Leonatus
 Preakness Stakes – Jacobus
 Belmont Stakes – George Kinney

Ice hockey
 The first Montreal Winter Carnival ice hockey tournament is held as part of the Montreal Winter Carnival in Montreal, Quebec, Canada in late January and early February. It is the first championship ice hockey tournament and is won by the Montreal McGill University team.
 5 March – The Ottawa Hockey Club is founded.

Luge
Events
 First organised competition takes place in Davos, Switzerland

Rowing
The Boat Race
 15 March — Oxford wins the 40th Oxford and Cambridge Boat Race

Rugby football
Home Nations Championship
 The inaugural series is won by England
Other events
 Foundation of Hull Kingston Rovers and Hunslet

Tennis
England
 Wimbledon Men's Singles Championship – William Renshaw (GB) defeats Ernest Renshaw (GB) 2–6 6–3 6–3 4–6 6–3
USA
 American Men's Singles Championship – Richard D. Sears (USA) defeats James Dwight (USA) 6–2 6–0 9–7

World
The 7th pre-open era 1883 Men's Tennis tour gets underway 30 tournaments are staged this year from 24 April to 12 November.

References

 
Sports by year